Tiberio Tinelli (1586 – 22 May 1639) was an Italian painter of the early-Baroque period, active mainly in his native city of Venice.

He trained with Giovanni Contarini, a pupil of the late Titian. Tinelli then either worked under or emulated Leandro Bassano. 
He was well known for his portraits of aristocracy, merchants, and intellectuals in Venice, whom he often painted in historical dress. His small pictures of historical and mythological subjects were also popular. Some of his pictures found their way into the collection of Louis XIII, king of France, who knighted him with the order of Michael. He moved later in life in Florence. Domestic afflictions drove him into a state of despondency, causing him to commit suicide.

Works
Portrait of Francesco Querini (c. 1615), Hood Museum of Art, Dartmouth College, New Hampshire
 Portrait of Luigi Moli (1637-1638), Gallerie dell'Accademia in Venice.
Portrait of Ludovico Widmann (1637), National Gallery of Art, Washington, DC
Portrait di Emilia Papafava Borromeo, Museo d'Arte Medioevale e Moderna, Padua

References

1586 births
1639 deaths
16th-century Italian painters
Italian male painters
17th-century Italian painters
Painters from Venice
Italian Baroque painters